Ramy is a masculine given name which may refer to:

 Ramy Ashour (born 1987), Egyptian retired squash player
 Ramy Ayach (born 1980), Lebanese singer
 Ramy Bensebaini (born 1995), Algerian footballer
 Ramy Essam (born 1987), Egyptian musician
 Ramy Imam (born 1974), Egyptian director, actor and producer
 Ramy Rabia (born 1993), Egyptian footballer
 Ramy Rabie (born 1982), Egyptian former footballer
 Ramy Romany, Egyptologist and documentary maker
 Ramy Youssef (born 1991), American stand-up comedian, actor and writer
 Big Ramy (Mamdouh Elssbiay, born 1984), Egyptian bodybuilder and Mr. Olympia champion

Arabic masculine given names